Elianna Walton (née Wilson; born 18 December 1984) is an Australian rugby league footballer who plays as a  for Mounties RLFC in the NSWRL Women's Premiership.

She previously played for the Sydney Roosters in the NRL Women's Premiership and is an Australian, Samoan and New South Wales representative.

Background
Walton was born in Auckland and moved to Australia when she was 15 to attend Wavell State High School in Brisbane. She began playing rugby league as a 15-year old, playing alongside her mother for Brothers Holy Spirit in the Brisbane open women's competition.

Her younger sisters, Stephanie and Eliza, represented the Cook Islands at the 2017 Women's Rugby League World Cup.

Playing career
In 2008, Walton played for the Canterbury-Bankstown Bulldogs in the Sydney Metropolitan Competition.

In 2009, she made her representative debuts for Australia and New South Wales.

In 2013, while playing for Canley Heights, she was a member of Australia's Women's Rugby League World Cup-winning squad. On 2 December 2017, she came off the bench and scored a try in Australia's World Cup final win over New Zealand at Suncorp Stadium.

In June 2018, Walton was announced as one of fifteen marquee signings by the Sydney Roosters NRL Women's Premiership squad. In Round 1 of the 2018 NRL Women's season, she made her debut for the Roosters in a 4–10 loss to the New Zealand Warriors.

On 22 June 2019, Walton captained Samoa in their 8–46 loss to New Zealand in Auckland.

References

External links
NRL profile

1984 births
Living people
New Zealand sportspeople of Samoan descent
New Zealand sportspeople of Cook Island descent
Australian female rugby league players
Australia women's national rugby league team players
Rugby league props
Sydney Roosters (NRLW) players